Ust-Muta (Motı-Oozı) is a rural locality (a selo) and the administrative centre of Ust-Mutainskoye Rural Settlement, Ust-Kansky District, the Altai Republic, Russia. The population was 445 as of 2016. There are 7 streets.

Geography 
Ust-Muta is located 42 km north of Ust-Kan (the district's administrative centre) by road. Keley is the nearest rural locality.

References 

Rural localities in Ust-Kansky District